Federal Hill is a low-density and affluent residential area in Kuala Lumpur, Malaysia. This residential area was developed during the British colonial era.

Federal Hill is covered by an  secondary forest. It is bordered by Lebuhraya Mahameru to the northeast, Jalan Travers to the southeast and Jalan Maarof to the southwest. KL Sentral is located across Jalan Bangsar. The Lake Gardens is situated adjacent to Federal Hill.

History
Federal Hill was formerly a swampy land. In 1896, rubber estates were established and were mostly privately owned by European government servants.  Today, some remnants of rubber trees can still be found here. 

Among the earliest government buildings placed here is the Bangsar Hospital (European Hospital) which was built in the early 1900s. It is now developed as the Health Institute or Institut Pengurusan Kesihatan. The most significant building is the Galeri Sri Perdana, which was formerly the Prime Minister's official residence.

Current land status
The land is owned by the Federal Department of Land and Mines. The administration and maintenance of the buildings and surroundings is carried out by Kuala Lumpur City Hall.

Architecture
There are 113 old government bungalows with gardens built during the 1950s.
The oldest existing building is the Malaysian Nature Society headquarters which can be seen on a 1929 map. There are four palaces at the hill belonging to the Johor, Kedah, Perak and Negeri Sembilan households.

Nature’s wealth
The flora and fauna in the hill includes more than 65 species of local and migratory birds, long tailed macaques, tree shrews and monitor lizards.
Plenty of mature forest trees are scattered along the hill slopes and gullies including big timber trees like tembusu, nyatoh tembaga, jelutong and pulai.

External links 

 Best Hill Stations

Suburbs in Kuala Lumpur